The Havre Mountains are a large group of mountains forming the northwestern extremity of Alexander Island, Antarctica, extending  in an east–west direction between Cape Vostok and the Russian Gap. They were first seen in 1821 by a Russian expedition under Fabian Gottlieb von Bellingshausen and re-sighted by the Belgian Antarctic Expedition, 1897–99. They were roughly charted by the French Antarctic Expedition, 1908–10, under Jean-Baptiste Charcot, who named them for Le Havre, the French port from which the Pourquol Pas? sailed in 1908. The mountains were mapped in detail from air photos taken by the Ronne Antarctic Research Expedition, 1947–48, by D. Searle of the Falkland Islands Dependencies Survey in 1960.

See also 
 Lassus Mountains
 Rouen Mountains

Further reading 
 United States. Defense Mapping Agency. Hydrographic Center, Sailing Directions for Antarctica: Includes Islands South of Latitude 60°, P 206
 Defense Mapping Agency  1992, Sailing Directions (planning Guide) and (enroute) for Antarctica, P 379

References 

Mountain ranges of Alexander Island